Ilo Onysymovych Mosashvili (7 January 1896 – 4 August 1954) was a Georgian writer, playwright and translator.

Life

Ilo Mosashvili was born on 7 January 1896 in Chargali village, now in Dusheti municipality, Georgia.
He studied at the St. Petersburg Psycho-Neurological Institute from 1914 to 1917.
He graduated from Kharkov University, Faculty of Law.
He was editor-in-chief of the magazine Schultz and editor of the newspaper Communist from 1926 to 1932.
From 1937 to 1940 he was Director of the Georgia Literary Foundation.

Mosashvili's first poem was published in the newspaper Light in 1911.
He also published short stories, essays and plays.
Several of his poems became songs.
He wrote works for children, and translated works by Shevchenko, Franko, Mayakovsky and Essenin.

After World War II (1939–1944) Mosashvili mainly worked in drama.
His play Chief of the Station (სადგურის უფროსი; 1947) was about the heroic defense of the Caucasus in World War II.
Sunken Stones (ჩაძირული ქვები; 1949) was about the life of Georgians in Turkey and elsewhere. 
It won the Stalin Prize in 1951.

Mosashvili died on 4 August 1954 in Tbilisi.
He is buried in the Didube Pantheon, Tbilisi.

Membership
Writers Union Board, Member
Presidium of the Writers' Union, Member
Radical Democratic Party, Member (1917-1918)
Union of Soviet Writers of Georgia, Member (1934-)
Supreme Council of the Georgian SSR, MP
Presidium of the Supreme Council of the Georgian SSR, member

Awards
Medal for "Labor Courage"
Medal for "Protection of the Caucasus"
Stalin Prize
Order of the Red Flag
Order of Lenin

Works

Screenplays
Mosashvili wrote screenplays for six films:

 Arshaula (Cкала Аршаула; 1935)
 Across the River (За рекой; 1935)
 Two Friends (Два друга; 1937)
 Girl from the Other Side (Девушка с того берега; 1940)
 The Sentry Box (В сторожевой будке; 1941)
 He Will Come Back (Он еще вернется: 1943)

Other

Notes

Sources

External links

1896 births
1954 deaths
Writers from Georgia (country)